Véronique Grandrieux (married name is Alard)(born September 16, 1952) is a former French athlete who specialised in the sprints.

Biography 
She won the  400 meters at the 1979 French championships. She also set the record three times in the French 4 × 100 Metres Relay, in 1978 and 1980 and also advanced the record of France in the indoor 400m.

She participated in the 1980 Olympics, in Moscow taking fifth in the 4 × 100m relay alongside Chantal Réga,  Raymonde Naigre and Emma Starving.

Prize list 
 Athletics Indoor Championships France   :  
 winner of 400 m 1979

Records

References

External links 
 Olympic profile for Véronique Grandrieux at sports-reference.com

1952 births
Living people
People from Villeneuve-le-Roi
Athletes (track and field) at the 1980 Summer Olympics
French female sprinters
Olympic athletes of France